

Seeds
  Danai Udomchoke
  Cecil Mamiit

Draw

Men's Singles